Teresa Mak Ka-kei (麥家琪) is a Hong Kong actress signed to ATV. She competed in the 1993 Miss Hong Kong Pageant.

Filmography

Mind Our Own Business (1993)
Mermaid Got Married as Kiki (1994)
Easy Money as Dee (1994)
Passion 1995 as Gucci (1994)
Sexy and Dangerous as Little Star (1996)
Street of Fury as Shan
Troublesome Night as JoJo (1997)
Erotic Ghost Story - Perfect Match as Evil Queen of Heaven (1997)
The Legendary 'Tai Fei' as Sis Kei (1999)
Troublesome Night 11 as Lan Sau Wan (2001)
Love Me, Love My Money as Fong (2001)
Martial Angels as Goldfish (2001)
Troublesome Night 17 (2002)
The Peeping (2002)
The Gigolo 2 (2016)
Happiness (2016)
Sisterhood (2016)
To Love or Not to Love (2017)
The First Girl I Love (2019)

References

External links

Teresa Mak at LoveHKFilm

20th-century Hong Kong actresses
21st-century Hong Kong actresses
Hong Kong film actresses
Hong Kong television actresses
1975 births
Living people